Francis Anthony 'Frank' Evers (born 27 August 1934) was a Gaelic footballer who played for the Galway county team in the 1950s and early 1960s. He played his last game for Galway in 1962.

Career
Evers was a native of Menlough, Galway. He started at the Senior National level in 1952, when he was only 18 years old.  Called a "towering figure of a man" and a "marvellous Croke Park man" by his colleague Jack Mahon, he also formed a famous centrefield partnership with Mattie McDonagh. He played for Westmeath Seniors in the League of 1952-53 and transferred to his native County Galway in 1953.  He won an All-Ireland Senior Football Championship with Galway in 1956, when Galway defeated Cork, and a Runners-up Shield in 1959, when Galway were defeated by Kerry in the '59 Final. He won six Connacht Senior Medals 1954 and 1956 - 1960,when he played in all five Connacht Finals. He was a member of Westmeath Minor team who won the 1952 Leinster Minor Championship, beaten in the All-Ireland Minor Football semi-final by Cavan. Frank's native County - Galway won the All Ireland Minor football Final in 1952.

Frank was a member of Franciscan College, Multyfarnham's Senior football team that won the Leinster senior football Colleges Championship in 1952, defeating St. Mels in the Leinster Final. Frank was selected for the Leinster Senior Colleges on two occasions 1951/52. Frank was selected on three occasions for the Ireland Selections to play the Irish Universities.

In 1960 Frank joined the United Nations Peacekeeping Organisation and left for the Middle East on 1 September, having played for Galway Seniors in the All Ireland semi-final of 1960 versus Kerry - one of his best displays in the maroon of Galway. Frank was picked for the Ireland Selection of 1960, however he was out of the country by that time and did not participate in the annual game. Frank's last game for Galway was in 1962, when he was home on holidays from the Middle East, this was also the last game for his teammate (and best man) Seán Purcell.

Frank was also selected for Connacht Senior Football teams, in the Railway Cup Competition and won Railway Cup Medals on two occasions. Frank won a Football National League medal in 1957, qualifying for a trip to New York City and played in the St. Brendan's Cup Final that year in the old Polo Grounds (in New York, USA).

Frank won a Galway Senior Championship Medal with Tuam Stars in 1962.

Frank played with Galway in 1958 in London's Wembley Stadium, in the inaugural Whit Weekend Games.

After retiring from Gaelic football, he worked for the United Nations - was a United Nations Staff member from 1 September 1960 to 27 August 1994 - 25 years in total. Had two breaks
from UN when he worked in Ireland as Chief of Personnel Div. with Standard Pressed Steel Galway and Digital Equipment Company NCR Dublin.
During his 25 years with United Nations he served in Sanaa Yemen,Cairo Egypt,Jerusalem Israel,Tiberias Israel, Nicosia Cyprus, Beirut Lebanon.Amman Jordan, Sinai Egypt,Vienna Austria,
Freetown Sierra Leone,ZagrebCroatia,.Ismailia Egypt.and with OSCE Kosovo.

Personal life
Frank was married to Irish actress Teresa Evers (née. Doyle) (years of marriage and divorce unknown), and they had 7 children. Deirdre, Mary, Deborah, Caroline, Frank, Sean and Rachel. He now lives in Vancouver, British Columbia, Canada, with his partner Birgitte. He has 19 grandchildren and 8 great-grandchildren.

References

Galway inter-county Gaelic footballers
Living people
1934 births